Yersinia entomophaga is a species of bacteria that was originally isolated from the diseased larvae of the New Zealand grass grub, Costelytra zealandica. The type strain is MH96 (= DSM 22339 = ATCC BAA-1678). It is currently being studied for biological pest control of insect pests like the porina moth, Wiseana cervinata.

Etymology
The name is derived from entomon, adj., cut up, segmented animal (used to refer to an insect) and phagos (voracious eater); N.L. fem. n. entomophaga insect eater.

References

External links
LPSN: Species Yersinia entomophaga

entomophaga
Bacteria described in 2011